The Canhoto River is a river of Pernambuco and Alagoas states in eastern Brazil. It is the main tributary of the Mundaú River.

See also
List of rivers of Alagoas
List of rivers of Pernambuco

References

Rivers of Alagoas
Rivers of Pernambuco